Cascade Park is a nature park and former amusement park in New Castle, Pennsylvania. The park was originally known as Big Run Falls when the area on which the park sits was purchased by Col. Levi Brinton in 1892. Power companies at the turn of the twentieth century found they could make profits developing amusement parks, so in 1897, the New Castle Traction Company (later known as the Pennsylvania Power Company, or Penn Power) bought the property from Col. Brinton. When the company held a contest for the park's name, ten-year-old Edwina Norris won ten dollars for submitting the name Cascade Park. The park opened on May 29, 1897.  The park was accessible not only via local trolley service but also via the Pittsburgh, Harmony, Butler and New Castle Railway, which later became the Harmony Short Line Motor Transportation Company' bus company.

 Expansion and rides 

A year after the park opened, its owners added a carousel, baseball park, theater, and dance pavilion, of which the pavilion is still standing. At the time, the dance pavilion was the largest in the state of Pennsylvania. The park's first roller coaster, the Toboggan, was also installed at this time. The year 1899 saw the addition of a zoo, picnic grove, and lake, the latter being created by damming the Big Run Creek which ran through the park. In 1922, the park's original carousel was replaced with one built by the Philadelphia Toboggan Company, a carousel which previously was located at Idora Park, Youngstown. Among the rides were:

 Carousel
 Original Gorge (built by IAD)
 Tumble Bug (built by Traver Engineering Company), located in Beaver Falls, Pennsylvania
 Bumper Cars (Auto Skooters by Lusse
 Circle Swings (another Traver Engineering Ride)
Whip
Fire Truck Ride
Penny Arcade
Kiddyland
Tubs of Fun
Rocket Ride
Tractor Ride (mini gas-powered tractors that the customers would drive around a track)
Riverboat (owned by son John "Cookie" Vesco)
Comet roller coaster 
One of the owner/operators of this early period was Billy Glenn. After he stopped as primary operator of the main attractions, he continued to personally operate his last concession in the park: a popcorn stand.

 Change of ownership and decline 

The year 1934 saw major changes for the park. Penn Power donated Cascade Park to the city of New Castle, stipulating that the area be forever used for public recreation. During the second quarter of the century, park attendance began to decline. The lake, popular for fishing, swimming, and boating, dried up when the Big Run dam broke. In the 1950s, Paul Vesco entered into a contract with the city to operate the park. He removed the original Gorge and replaced it with a new roller coaster of his own design, originally using the same name (Gorge), but several years later changing the name to The Comet.

The coaster cars were built by National Amusement Devices, in their popular Century Flyer style. One of the coaster's most unusual features was that it was built on the edge of a valley. Most roller coasters of the day were towed up to the highest point by a chain and as the energy and momentum of the coaster was expended, the hills got smaller towards the end. The Gorge/Comet was different in that it left the station at ground level and "fell" into the valley, so the first drop was actually the second biggest drop. The coaster went down the valley, turned around and went up a chain hoist to the opposite side of the valley. It then turned around and dropped into the valley for the coaster's biggest dip and came back up the hill to return into the back of the station.

The park managed to stay afloat during the 1970s and early 1980s despite a continuing drop in attendance. The coaster was damaged in 1982 when a tree fell on it. By this time the area had fallen on hard economic times, and the Comet was torn down several years later.

 Renewed interest and revival 

A New Castle square dancing group called the Paws and Taws began raising funds in the late 1970s to repair and restore the park's historic dance pavilion. Community interest in reviving the park soon followed, and the Cascade Park Development Committee, a group of volunteers, organized in 1980. The group came up with a plan to restore the park, and it was agreed at that point that any future development at the park would reflect its Victorian roots. During the 1980s, the park's old rides were removed, flowers and shrubs were planted, buildings were improved, public restrooms were built, and a playground was added.  Local clubs like the Rotary Club, Lawrence County Garden Club, and the Lawrence County Bocce Ball League have also contributed in the park's restoration. Walking and hiking trails have also been added.

Today, the park is the site of community events such as the Back to the 1950s Weekend''. Andria Parady became the master of ceremonies of the 50s Weekend in late 2015.

References

External links 

 Lawrence County Historical Society Youtube video
 Pennsylvania Power Company (Penn Power)
 Mike's Historic Amusement Parks, Cascade Park
 Idora Park
 Philadelphia Toboggan Coasters, Inc.
 New Castle News - Vescos remember Cascade Park

Philadelphia Toboggan Coasters carousels
Amusement parks in Pennsylvania
Defunct amusement parks in Pennsylvania
Parks in Lawrence County, Pennsylvania
1897 establishments in Pennsylvania